"The Card" is the first segment of the thirty-second episode (the thirteenth episode of the second season (1986–87) of the television series The Twilight Zone. This segment centers on a credit card company which, in lieu of the more normal practice of repossession, deals with severe delinquent accounts by taking possession of the debtor's loved ones.

Plot
Linda Wolfe, a mother of three and a compulsive spender, is invited to become a cardholder for a "last resort" credit company called The Card. Despite assuring office manager Catherine Foley that she has learned her lesson after having multiple credit cards revoked, she signs the credit agreement without reading it (ignoring Catherine's warning that there are special terms) and becomes repeatedly late on payments.

Linda's cat mysteriously disappears along with its dishes, and no one else in the family remembers that they ever had a cat. The following week, their dog disappears and none of the family remembers ever owning a dog. Linda's husband Brian, recognizing she has been repeatedly late on payments, makes her promise to stop using The Card. However, Linda's car breaks down and since she only has $12 in cash for a mechanic, she uses her credit card. As a result of using her card while delinquent, Linda's three children disappear. Brian says he is tired of her delusions that they have children, a cat, and a dog, and insists that she see a psychiatrist. She agrees to see one in the morning but instead flees into the night.

Linda suspects the credit card company might be behind it all. She goes to The Card and sees her children in the office. Catherine informs Linda that because she failed to make her payments on time, they took possession of her pets and children to cover her bills, along with all memories that anyone but her have of them. The Card then disburses its "acquisitions" in what they believe to be better environments. Linda tries to buy back her children with a check from her and Brian's joint account, since her own account is overdrawn. Catherine accepts it but warns that if it does not clear another penalty will be invoked.

Linda runs home to tell Brian about the check, but the bank has already called him and he cancelled it. Everything then starts to disappear around her: car, furniture, and Brian. As a result, her credit card reverts to Linda's maiden name (Wilson). She belatedly cuts the credit card in two as her house and everything in it including Linda disappear. The only thing left is the cut credit card, which is now nameless, implying as part of the final penalty, Linda has also been "repossessed.”

External links
 

1987 American television episodes
The Twilight Zone (1985 TV series season 2) episodes
Television episodes about multiple time paths

fr:La Carte de la dernière chance